Riverview railway station is located on the Main line in Queensland, Australia. It serves the Ipswich suburb of Riverview. It opened in 1875 at the same time the line opened.

Services
Riverview is served by trains operating to and from Ipswich and Rosewood. Most city-bound services run to Caboolture and Nambour, with some morning peak trains terminating at Bowen Hills. Some afternoon inbound services on weekdays run to Kippa-Ring. Riverview is fourteen minutes from Ipswich and 44 minutes on an all-stops train from Central.

Services by platform

*Note: One weekday morning service (4:56am from Central) and selected afternoon peak services continue through to Rosewood.  At all other times, a change of train is required at Ipswich.

References

External links

[ Riverview station] TransLink
Riverview station Queensland's Railways on the Internet

Railway stations in Ipswich City
Railway stations in Australia opened in 1875
Main Line railway, Queensland
Riverview, Queensland